Magnolia coriacea is a species of flowering plant in the family Magnoliaceae. It is native to China. There are no more than about 500 individuals remaining of this endangered species.

This is a tree growing 10 to 20 meters tall. The leaves are up to 15 centimeters long. The flowers have white tepals.

References

Further reading
Tang, C. Q., et al. (2011). Habitat fragmentation, degradation, and population status of endangered Michelia coriacea in southeastern Yunnan, China. Mountain Research and Development, 31(4), 343–350.
Zhao, X., & Sun, W. (2009). Abnormalities in sexual development and pollinator limitation in Michelia coriacea (Magnoliaceae), a critically endangered endemic to Southeast Yunnan, China. Flora, 204(6), 463–470.
Zhao, X., Ma, Y., Sun, W., Wen, X., & Milne, R. (2012). High genetic diversity and low differentiation of Michelia coriacea (Magnoliaceae), a critically endangered endemic in southeast Yunnan, China. International Journal of Molecular Sciences, 13(4), 4396–4411.

coriacea
Flora of China
Trees of China
Endangered flora of Asia
Taxonomy articles created by Polbot